"Loving Blind" is a song written and recorded by American country music artist Clint Black. It was released in January 1991 as the second single from his album Put Yourself in My Shoes. It was his seventh single overall and it became his fifth single to  reach number one on both the Billboard Hot Country Singles & Tracks and the Canadian RPM country Tracks chart.

Music video
The music video was directed by Bill Young and premiered in early 1991.

Chart performance
"Loving Blind" spent two weeks at number 1 on the Hot Country Songs chart beginning for the week of March 23, 1991. It spent the week beginning April 6, 1991 at number 1 on the Canadian RPM charts.

Year-end charts

References

1991 singles
1990 songs
Clint Black songs
Songs written by Clint Black
Song recordings produced by James Stroud
RCA Records singles